Liberation by Oppression: A Comparative Study of Slavery and Psychiatry is a 2002 critique of psychiatry by the psychiatrist Thomas Szasz.

Summary

Szasz compares the justification of psychiatry with the justification of slavery in the United States, stating that both necessarily deny the subject's right to personhood.

Reception
Reviews on this book were published by Psychiatric Services, The British Journal of Psychiatry, Ethical Human Sciences and Services, and The Independent Review.

References

2002 non-fiction books
American non-fiction books
Anti-psychiatry books
Books by Thomas Szasz
English-language books